Guillaume Moreau (born 8 March 1983 in Limoges, France) is a French racing driver who is currently competing in the Le Mans Series.  In 2008, Moreau shared the GT1 class championship with teammate Patrice Goueslard in the Le Mans Series driving a Luc Alphand Corvette.

After beginning his career in single-seaters, Moreau switched to sports car racing. He has competed in five consecutive editions of the 24 Hours of Le Mans race, from  until , with a best result of seventh overall and second in class in the  event. He was also scheduled to drive in the  race, but withdrew after crashing heavily during the test day preceding the event, sustaining damage to his twelfth vertebra and compressing his spinal cord. After successful surgery, he is currently recuperating from his injuries.

Racing record

Complete Formula Renault 3.5 Series results
(key) (Races in bold indicate pole position) (Races in italics indicate fastest lap)

24 Hours of Le Mans results

References

External links 

 
 Guillaume Moreau career statistics at Driver Database

French racing drivers
1983 births
Living people
French Formula Renault 2.0 drivers
Formula Renault Eurocup drivers
Formula 3 Euro Series drivers
24 Hours of Le Mans drivers
European Le Mans Series drivers
World Series Formula V8 3.5 drivers
American Le Mans Series drivers
FIA World Endurance Championship drivers
Blancpain Endurance Series drivers
24 Hours of Spa drivers

Signature Team drivers
KTR drivers
OAK Racing drivers
SG Formula drivers
Graff Racing drivers